Brian A. Metcalf is an American filmmaker. He wrote, directed and produced the Lionsgate crime thriller film Adverse, released in February 2021.

Biography
Metcalf directed the micro-budgeted drama/thriller The Lost Tree. The premiere was held at the TCL Chinese Theatre before a limited theatrical release in 2012.

Metcalf wrote, directed and produced Living Among Us which stars John Heard (in his final performance), William Sadler, James Russo, Esme Bianco, Andrew Keegan and Thomas Ian Nicholas. The film was distributed by Sony Pictures Home Entertainment and given a limited theatrical release in 2017.

Metcalf designed the poster for the Syrian documentary Little Gandhi, and won the Murray Weissman Award for it.

Metcalf created and directed the drama/thriller film Adverse, with a cast including Mickey Rourke, Lou Diamond Phillips, Sean Astin, Penelope Ann Miller, Matt Ryan, Jake T. Austin, Thomas Ian Nicholas, Andrew Keegan and Shelley Regner. 

The film was praised by critics, carrying a 75% rating at Rotten Tomatoes.

Adverse premiered at Fantasporto Film Festival in Portugal. Metcalf won a Platinum Remi Award for directing Adverse at the 2020 WorldFest-Houston International Film Festival. He also won an Award of Excellence Special Mention from IndieFEST for his work on Adverse.  Both Deadline Hollywood and Variety announced that Lionsgate's Grindstone Entertainment would be distributing the film. It opened in theaters on February 12, 2021.

After working together on Adverse, Variety announced a new collaboration between Rourke and Metcalf titled Twilight Into Darkness in which both of them would produce and Metcalf would direct.

On December 13, 2022, Variety announced that Metcalf would be writing, producing, directing and showrunning a new limited series called Underdeveloped starring Thomas Ian Nicholas, Tom Arnold, Mark Pellegrino, Samm Levine, Shelley Regner, Kelly Arjen, Charlene Amoia, Nolan River and Jaret Reddick.

Filmography

References

External links

American film directors
American film directors of Korean descent
Living people
Year of birth missing (living people)